Deltophora digitiformis is a moth of the family Gelechiidae that is endemic to China.

References

Moths described in 2002
Endemic fauna of China
Moths of Asia
Deltophora